The 2009–10 Argentine Primera B Nacional was the 24th season of second division professional of football in Argentina. A total of 20 teams competed; the champion and runner-up were promoted to Argentine Primera División.

Club information

Standings

Promotion/relegation playoff Legs Primera División-Primera B Nacional
The 3rd and 4th placed of the table played with the 18th and the 17th placed of the Relegation Table of 2009–10 Primera División.

|-
!colspan="5"|Promotion playoff 1

|-
!colspan="5"|Promotion playoff 2

|-
|}

All Boys was promoted to 2010–11 Primera División  by winning the playoff and Rosario Central was relegated to 2010–11 Primera B Nacional.
Gimnasia y Esgrima (LP) remained in the Primera División by winning the playoff.

Relegation

Note: Clubs with indirect affiliation with AFA are relegated to the Torneo Argentino A, while clubs directly affiliated face relegation to Primera B Metropolitana. Clubs with direct affiliation are all from Greater Buenos Aires, with the exception of Newell's, Rosario Central, Central Córdoba and Argentino de Rosario, all from Rosario, and Unión and Colón from Santa Fe.

The bottom two teams of this table face relegation regardless of their affiliation status. Apart from them, the bottom teams of each affiliation face promotion/relegation playoffs against Torneo Argentino A and Primera B Metropolitana's "Reducido" (reduced tournaments) champions. The Reducidos are played after those leagues' champions are known.

Updated as of games played on June 18, 2010.Source:

Relegation Playoff Legs

|-
!colspan="5"|Relegation/promotion playoff 1 (Direct affiliation vs. Primera B Metropolitana)

|-
!colspan="5"|Relegation/promotion playoff 2 (Indirect affiliation vs. Torneo Argentino A)

 Deportivo Merlo remained in the Primera B Nacional by winning the playoff.
 CAI remained in the Primera B Nacional by winning the playoff.

See also
2009–10 in Argentine football

References

External links

2009–10 in Argentine football leagues
Primera B Nacional seasons